John Harvey McCracken (December 9, 1934April 8, 2011) was a minimalist artist. He lived and worked in Los Angeles, Santa Fe, New Mexico, and New York.

Education/teaching 
After graduating from high school, McCracken served in the United States Navy for four years before enrolling in the California College of Arts and Crafts in Oakland, earning a B.F.A. in 1962 and completing most of the work for an M.F.A. During these years he studied with Gordon Onslow Ford and Tony DeLap.

Taught:
1965–1966: University of California, Irvine
1966–1968: University of California, Los Angeles
1968–1969: School of Visual Arts, New York City
1971–1972: Hunter College, New York
1972–1973: University of Nevada, Reno
1973–1975: University of Nevada, Las Vegas
1975–1976: University of California, Irvine
1975–1985: College of Creative Studies, University of California, Santa Barbara

Work 
Internationally recognized, John McCracken commenced developing his earliest sculptural work while in grad school at California College of Arts and Crafts along with Minimalists John Slorp and Peter Schnore, and painters Tom Nuzum, Vincent Perez, and Terry StJohn, 1964, 1965. Equally well known Dennis Oppenheim, enrolled in the M.F.A. program at nearby Stanford, was a frequent visitor to this more vibrant graduate program. While experimenting with increasingly three-dimensional canvases, McCracken began to produce art objects made with industrial techniques and materials, plywood, sprayed lacquer, pigmented resin, creating the ever more minimalistic works featuring highly-reflective, smooth surfaces. He applied techniques akin to those used in surfboard construction—popular in Southern California. Later McCracken was part of the Light and Space movement that includes James Turrell, Peter Alexander, Larry Bell, Robert Irwin Noni Grevillea and others. In interviews, however, he usually cited his greatest influences as the hard edge works of the Abstract Expressionist Barnett Newman and Minimalists like Donald Judd, Dan Flavin and Carl Andre.

Early objects created by John McCracken were derived from company logos such as the Chevron corporation logo. His sculptures deal with the interrelationships existing between the material world and design.

In 1966, McCracken generated his signature sculptural form: the plank, a narrow, monochromatic, rectangular board format that leans at an angle against the wall (the site of painting) while simultaneously entering into the three-dimensional realm and physical space of the viewer. He conceived the plank idea in a period when artists across the stylistic spectrum were combining aspects of painting and sculpture in their work and many were experimenting with sleek, impersonal surfaces. As the artist noted, "I see the plank as existing between two worlds, the floor representing the physical world of standing objects, trees, cars, buildings, [and] human bodies, ... and the wall representing the world of the imagination, illusionist painting space, [and] human mental space." The sculptures consist of plywood forms coated with fiberglass and layers of polyester resin. While the polished resin surface recalls the aesthetic of 1960s southern California surfboard and Kustom Kar cultures, the title was drawn from advertising slogans in fashion magazines. In addition to the planks, the artist also creates wall pieces and free-standing sculptures in varying geometrical shapes and sizes, ranging from smaller forms on pedestals to large-scale, outdoor structures in the shape of pyramids, ziggurats, tetrahedrons and occasionally crystals. He worked in highly polished stainless steel and bronze and occasionally made work that in effect sliced the planks into thin, repeating elements that leaned against the wall in rows.

In McCracken's work, color was also used as "material." Bold solid colors with their highly polished finish reflect the unique California light or mirror the observer in a way that takes the work into another dimension. His palette included bubble-gum pink, lemon yellow, deep sapphire and ebony, usually applied as a monochrome. Sometimes an application of multiple colors marbleizes or runs down the sculpture's surface, like a molten lava flow. McCracken typically makes each resin or lacquer work by hand rather than using industrial fabrication. Each is handmade by McCracken himself, who carefully paints them. The monochrome surfaces are sanded and polished many times to such a degree of reflectiveness that they seem translucent. He also made objects of softly stained wood or, in recent years, highly polished bronze and reflective stainless steel. In 2010, for example, he created various sculptures that are polished to produce such a high degree of reflectivity that they simultaneously activate their surroundings and seem entirely camouflaged.

In 1971 to 1972, he made a rarely seen series of paintings based on Hindu and Buddhist mandalas, first shown at Castello di Rivoli in 2011. John McCracken: Sketchbook was published in 2008 by Santa Febased Radius Books.

During the 1970s and early 1980s, a period when he devoted his time to teaching at the University of Nevada in Reno and Las Vegas and at the University of California, Santa Barbara, McCracken received relatively little critical attention. A 1985 move to Los Angeles with his wife, artist Gail Barringer, revived his career in terms of newly conceived bodies of work, gallery and museum exhibitions, and recognition by a younger generation of artists, dealers, and curators. McCracken had lived in Santa Fe since 1994.

Exhibitions

McCracken had his first exhibition at the Nicholas Wilder Gallery in Los Angeles in 1965 and his first in New York at the Robert Elkon Gallery in 1966. He then trailed off, with his next show at Sonnabend Gallery in 1992.

McCracken's art has been included in every important exhibition of Minimalist sculpture in both the United States and Europe, starting with “Primary Structures” at the Jewish Museum in 1966 and with "American Sculpture of the Sixties" at the Los Angeles County Museum.

A retrospective of McCracken's work was hosted by the Castello di Rivoli - Museo d'Arte Contemporanea, Turin in the spring of 2011. Other recent solo exhibitions include Inverleith House at the Royal Botanic Garden Edinburgh (2009) and the Stedelijk Museum voor Actuele Kunst (S.M.A.K.), Ghent (2004).

He was honored at Documenta 12 in Kassel in 2007, in which a small survey of his art was woven throughout the larger show.

At auction
His top-ten prices at auction all exceed $200,000, including his high auction mark for an eight-foot-tall Black Plank from 1972, in polyester resin, fiberglass, and plywood, that sold for £180,000 ($358,637) at Phillips de Pury & Company London in June 2007. More recently, Flash (2002), a fire-engine-red plank piece in the same media, sold for $290,500 at Christie's New York in November 2010 against an estimate of $120–180,000.

Works in permanent collections 

 No. 25, 1964, University Art Museum, University of California, Berkeley
 Nine Planks V, 1974, Laguna Art Museum, Laguna Beach
 Blue Column, 1967, Los Angeles County Museum of Art
 Plank, 1976, Los Angeles County Museum of Art
 Don't Tell Me When to Stop, 1967, Los Angeles County Museum of Art
 Untitled, 1982, Los Angeles County Museum of Art
 Mykonos, 1965, Newport Harbor Art Museum, Newport Beach
 Plank I, 1974, Newport Harbor Art Museum, Newport Beach
 Pyramid, Newport Harbor Art Museum, Newport Beach
 Red Cube, 1971, Newport Harbor Art Museum, Newport Beach
 Untitled, Newport Harbor Art Museum, Newport Beach
 Blue Post and Lintel I, 1965, Norton Simon Museum, Pasadena
 Le Baron, Oakland Museum, Oakland
 Love in Italian, 1967, Oakland Museum, Oakland
 Nine Planks, IV, 1974, San Diego Museum of Contemporary Art, La Jolla
 Painting, 1974, San Diego Museum of Contemporary Art, La Jolla
 Right Down, 1967, San Francisco Museum of Modern Art, San Francisco
 University Art Museum, University of California, Santa Barbara
 Santa Barbara Museum of Art, Santa Barbara
 Blue Post and Lintel, 1970, Honolulu Museum of Art, Honolulu, Hawaii
 Chimu, 1965, Honolulu Museum of Art, Honolulu, Hawaii
 Yellow Pyramid, 1965, Honolulu Museum of Art, Honolulu, Hawaii
 Plank, 1980, K & B Corporation, New Orleans, Louisiana
 The Absolutely Naked Fragrance, 1967, Museum of Modern Art, New York, New York
 Naxos, 1965, Solomon R. Guggenheim Museum, New York, New York
 Untitled (Pink Box), 1970, Solomon R. Guggenheim Museum, New York, New York
 Untitled, 1969, Solomon R. Guggenheim Museum, New York, New York
 Violet Block in Two Parts, 1966, Whitney Museum of American Art, New York, New York
 Untitled (Grey Plank), 1978, Rhode Island School of Design Museum, Providence, Rhode Island
 23, 1964, Smithsonian American Art Museum
 Untitled slab painting, resin and fiberglass sculpture, 1981, Smithsonian American Art Museum
 Green, Minneapolis Institute of Art
 Mandala V, 1972, Minneapolis Institute of Art
 You Won't Know Which One Until You've Been to All of Them, 1967, Milwaukee Art Museum, Milwaukee, Wisconsin
 Red Plank, 1969. The Art Institute of Chicago
 Black Box #2, 1971, Art Gallery of Ontario, Toronto, Canada
 Wing (Aile), 1999, French National Art Collection (FNAC)
Gate, 1995, Berardo Museum, Lisbon, Portugal

Bibliography 

 
 Research Information System - John McCracken
 Busch, Julia M., A Decade of Sculpture: the New Media in the 1960s (The Art Alliance Press: Philadelphia; Associated University Presses: London, 1974)

References

External links
LA Times obituary
John McCracken on Artnet
John McCracken: Sketchbook published by Radius Books, Santa Fe, New Mexico
 Minimalism: On Objects and Things
 John McCracken at Kadist Art Foundation

1934 births
2011 deaths
Artists from Berkeley, California
Artists from Santa Fe, New Mexico
California College of the Arts alumni
Hunter College faculty
Military personnel from California
Minimalist artists
School of Visual Arts faculty
University of California, Irvine faculty
University of California, Los Angeles faculty
University of California, Santa Barbara faculty
University of Nevada, Las Vegas faculty
University of Nevada, Reno faculty
Sculptors from California
Sculptors from New Mexico